
Trevor John McDougall   FAGU   is a physical oceanographer specialising in ocean mixing and the thermodynamics of seawater. He is Scientia Professor of Ocean Physics in the School of Mathematics and Statistics at the University of New South Wales, Sydney, Australia. He is president of the International Association for the Physical Sciences of the Oceans (IAPSO) of the International Union of Geodesy and Geophysics.

Education 
After attending Unley High School in Adelaide, South Australia, McDougall went to St Mark's College (University of Adelaide) and graduated from the University of Adelaide in Mechanical Engineering in 1973. He obtained a Doctor of Philosophy in 1978 from the University of Cambridge and a Graduate Diploma in Economics from the Australian National University in 1982.

Research and career 
McDougall undertook his PhD studies in the Department of Applied Mathematics and Theoretical Physics (DAMTP) and St John's College, Cambridge of the University of Cambridge where he was supervised by Professors Stewart Turner and Paul Linden. In 1978 he returned to Australia on a Queen's Fellowship in Marine Science at the Research School of Earth Sciences, Australian National University (ANU).  After five years at ANU he was appointed to CSIRO in Hobart as a physical oceanographer. Since 2012 he has been Scientia Professor of Ocean Physics in the School of Mathematics and Statistics at the University of New South Wales, Sydney.

McDougall's research in physical oceanography has provided insight to how seawater mixes under different conditions, which is important for understanding climate change. The ocean and the atmosphere play roughly equal roles in transporting heat from the equatorial region to the poles, and McDougall's research is concerned with how the ocean reduces the equator-to-pole temperature differences, thus making Earth habitable.

McDougall is known for developing, together with David Jackett, an algorithm for defining neutral density surfaces. These are the surfaces along which swirling ocean eddies — that are 10–500 kilometres wide and persist for many months — mix. The rate of turbulent mixing in the ocean is a factor of ten million times stronger along "density" surfaces than in the direction across these surfaces. The accurate modelling of the ocean’s role in climate relies on being able to accurately define and evaluate these surfaces. McDougall has also made significant contributions to incorporating the concepts of mixing and heat into ocean models.

He is president of the International Association for the Physical Sciences of the Oceans (IAPSO) of the International Union of Geodesy and Geophysics. He chaired the working group of SCOR and IAPSO that developed the international standard definitions of the thermodynamic properties of seawater, humid air, and ice (TEOS-10, Thermodynamic Equation of Seawater - 2010), which were adopted by the Intergovernmental Oceanographic Commission in 2009.

Awards and honours
McDougall was elected a Fellow of the Royal Society in 2012.  He is also a fellow of the Australian Academy of Science (1997), the CSIRO (2007), the Australian Meteorological and Oceanographic Society (2004), the Institute of Physics (2012), the Royal Society of New South Wales (2015),  and the American Geophysical Union (2018). His other awards include: 
 Prime Minister's Prize for Science, 2022, For his discovery of four new ocean mixing processes and his work to define the thermodynamic properties of seawater 
 Prize of Excellence, Werner Petersen Foundation, Kiel, Germany, 2018.
  Companion of the Order of Australia in 2018 for eminent service to science, and to education, particularly in the area of ocean thermodynamics, as an academic, and researcher, to furthering the understanding of climate science, and as a mentor of young scientists.
 New South Wales Premier's Prize for Excellence in Mathematics, Earth Sciences, Chemistry and Physics, 2017.
 John Conrad Jaeger Medal 2015, awarded by the Australian Academy of Science.
 Henry Houghton chair for visiting senior earth scientists, Massachusetts Institute of Technology, 2015 
 Australian Laureate Fellowship, 2015, awarded by the Australian Research Council
 Royal Society of Tasmania Medal 2013, awarded by the Royal Society of Tasmania.
 Prince Albert I Medal, 2011, awarded by the International Association for the Physical Sciences of the Oceans (IAPSO) of the IUGG.
 Anton Bruun Medal, awarded by the Intergovernmental Oceanographic Commission, 2009.
 A.G. Huntsman Award for Excellence in the Marine Sciences, presented by the Royal Society of Canada, 2005.
  Centenary Medal, 2001.
 M. R. Banks Medal, awarded by the Royal Society of Tasmania, 1998.<ref name = "Banks" 
 Humboldt Prize, given by the Alexander von Humboldt Foundation, 1997.
 David Rivett Medal, awarded to a CSIRO Scientist who is less than 40 years old, 1992.
 Frederick White Prize, awarded by the Australian Academy of Science, 1988.
 J. T. Knight Prize, 1976, awarded by the University of Cambridge.
 South Australian Engineering Design Award, with Dr Garry L. Brown, awarded by Engineers Australia, 1975.

References

External links 
 Trevor McDougall's UNSW webpage

Australian oceanographers
Australian Fellows of the Royal Society
Fellows of the Australian Academy of Science
Fellows of the Royal Society
Fellows of the Royal Society of New South Wales
Fellows of the Institute of Physics
Recipients of the Centenary Medal
Humboldt Research Award recipients
Academic staff of the University of New South Wales
Fluid dynamicists
Physical oceanographers
1952 births
People from Hobart
Living people
Scientists from Adelaide
People from Sydney
Australian National University alumni
University of Adelaide alumni
Alumni of the University of Cambridge
Alumni of St John's College, Cambridge
CSIRO people
Companions of the Order of Australia
Fellows of the American Geophysical Union